Club Deportivo La Granja is a football team based in La Granja in the autonomous community of Castile and León. Founded in 1976, it plays in the Tercera División – Group 8. Its stadium is El Hospital with a capacity of 2,000 seats.

Season to season

11 seasons in Tercera División

Reference

External links
Official website 
Futbolme team profile 

Football clubs in Castile and León
Association football clubs established in 1976
1976 establishments in Spain
Province of Segovia